The Walsh County Record is a weekly newspaper printed in Grafton, North Dakota.  It is the newspaper of record of Walsh County, North Dakota covering news, sports, business, community events, and job openings for Grafton, North Dakota and the surrounding communities.  The paper has a modest circulation in northeast North Dakota.It has run under its current title since 1992. In 2002, it won an award for general excellence from the North Dakota Newspaper Association. It is published by Jackie Thompson and edited by Amy Venn.

History 
Founded in 1889 as a weekly, the Walsh County Record was initially a Republican paper. Its 1901 circulation was just over 1,000. It was edited by W.E. Balkee for much of the postwar period.

References

External links
The Walsh County Record website

Newspapers published in North Dakota
Walsh County, North Dakota
Publications established in 1889
1889 establishments in North Dakota
Grafton, North Dakota